Jorge Aguirre is an American author and children's television show writer and producer. He is the writer of the graphic novel series The Chronicles of Claudette for Macmillan/First Second Books. The series includes Giants Beware, Dragons Beware, and Monsters Beware.  He is also the co-creator of Disney Junior's Goldie & Bear with Rick Gitelson. He has also written for Martha Speaks, Dora the Explorer, Dora and Friends, Handy Manny and other shows. He was born and raised in Columbus, Ohio to Colombian parents. He lives in Montclair, New Jersey.

He has been reviewed by major publications.

References

External links
 
 

 

21st-century American male writers
21st-century American screenwriters
Television producers from Ohio
American television writers
Writers from Columbus, Ohio
American people of Colombian descent
American graphic novelists
Novelists from Ohio
Screenwriters from Ohio
American male television writers
Living people
Year of birth missing (living people)